The Elm Park Bridge, sometimes locally referred to as the BDI Bridge or the Ice Cream Bridge, is a steel truss bridge over the Red River in Winnipeg, Manitoba.

It links Kingston Crescent in the neighbourhood of St. Vital with Jubilee Avenue in the neighbourhood of Fort Rouge. Built in 1912 and opened in 1914, it is the fourth-oldest bridge in Winnipeg after the Redwood, Louise, and Arlington.

The nickname "BDI Bridge" is derived from the popular ice-cream vendor, Bridge Drive-In (BDI), that sits adjacent to the bridge. In turn, BDI itself is so-named because of its proximity to the Elm Park Bridge.

History
Elm Park (now Kingston Crescent and Kingston Row), the former trolley park beside which the bridge was built, was created in 1890 by the Elm Park Company, whose parent company, Winnipeg Street Railway Co., wanted to attract passengers onto their new streetcar line which ran down Osborne Street to Jubilee. At this time, a seasonal pontoon bridge allowed people access from Jubilee Avenue to the park’s entrance in what was then the Rural Municipality of St. Vital. In 1912, Winnipeg Street Railway figured a better idea for their business would be to subdivide the park's land for residential development.

This development included replacing the pontoon bridge with a toll bridge; Roland Fairbairn McWilliams, owner of Elm Park, had tried on numerous occasions to have the City of Winnipeg pay for the construction of a better bridge across the Red River between Jubilee and St. Vital. A full-page ad in the Winnipeg Free Press in May 1912 had a diagram showing the new bridge with the park street-car line loop ending on the Jubilee side of the Red River and advertising "[f]ive minute [street]car service to the city."

The bridge was built between 1912 and 1913 by the Elm Park Bridge Company at a cost of CA$125,000, for which the implementation of a toll was meant to offset. The RM of St. Vital council meeting that took place in December 1912 passed a motion saying that they wanted the bridge moved, preferring it to be located closer to Pembina Street (now Osborne Street). The City of Winnipeg "opened" the section of Jubilee so that the streetcar could terminate at the new Elm Park Bridge.

It also included a sidewalk on its east side. The toll was 5 cents for pedestrians, 10 cents for cars, and 25 cents for trucks. Until the nearby St. Vital Bridge was built at Osborne Street in 1965, Elm Park Bridge was one of just three ways Winnipeg motorists were able to cross into St. Vital.

With the bridge in poor condition, the Elm Park Company decided to close it indefinitely in August 1945. This allowed the Municipality of St. Vital the opportunity later that year to purchased the bridge for $5,000, who would then make the necessary repairs. The bridge was reopened in 1946 with tolls removed. During the summer of that year, the bridge was temporarily closed as result of a repair project that involved replacing the wood under asphalt. The project involved two layers of asphalt being poured over the wood, which came from the cordite plant in Transcona.

In 1950, the Red River flood nearly washed the bridge away as water came right up to its deck level. On 1 May 1957, the now-popular ice-cream vendor, Bridge Drive-In (BDI), was opened adjacent to the bridge.

In 1974, the bridge was closed off to vehicular traffic, remaining accessible to only pedestrians and cyclists ever since.

Facing heavy renovation costs for the bridge in the mid-1990s, the city looked into the possibility of tearing it down. However, after discovering that such endeavour would cost $1,000,000, the city backed off the idea. In the spring of 2010, the bridge's concrete piers were fixed at a cost of $300,000.

On 24 May 2014, Winnipeg celebrated the Bridge's 100th anniversary, with city councillors Brian Mayes (St. Vital) and Jenny Gerbasi (Fort Rouge-East Fort Garry) unveiling a plaque in commemoration of the occasion.

The Park Line streetcar route provided access between Elm Park and downtown Winnipeg via the Elm Park bridge.

References

External links 
 

Pedestrian bridges in Manitoba
Pedestrian bridges in Canada
Former toll bridges in Canada
St. Vital, Winnipeg